Alanis Morissette – The Singles Box, commonly abbreviated as simply The Singles Box, is a compilation box set by Alanis Morissette, released on April 8, 1997 by Maverick. The set includes five of her six singles from 1995's Jagged Little Pill: "Ironic", "Hand in My Pocket", "Head over Feet", "You Learn" and "You Oughta Know", as well as live tracks and alternate versions of JLP tracks spread across five maxi-CDs. Also included in the box set is a short booklet of Alanis photos and other extras, including a note to her fans written by Morissette herself.

The Singles Box was released only in Europe and Australia and in limited quantities.

Morissette's sixth single, "All I Really Want", is the only single that wasn't given a disc in The Singles Box. "All I Really Want" and "Mary Jane" are the only tracks from Jagged Little Pill that didn't appear in the set in any form.

Track listing
All lyrics written by Alanis Morissette. All music written by Alanis Morissette and Glen Ballard.

CD 1: You Oughta Know

"You Oughta Know (Album Version)" – 4:09
"You Oughta Know (Clean Album Version)" – 4:08
"Perfect (Studio Acoustic Version)" – 3:06
"You Oughta Know (Live at the 1996 Grammys)" – 3:48

CD 2: Ironic

"Ironic (Album Version)" – 3:50
"Forgiven (Live from Tokyo)" – 6:10
"Not the Doctor (Modern Rock Live from L.A.)" – 6:05
"Wake Up (Modern Rock Live from L.A.)" – 5:06

CD 3: You Learn

"You Learn (Album Version)" – 4:00
"Your House (Live from Tokyo)" – 3:06
"Wake Up (Modern Rock Live from L.A.)" – 5:06
"Hand in My Pocket (Album Version)" – 3:42

CD 4: Hand in My Pocket

"Hand in My Pocket (Clean Version)" – 3:42
"Head Over Feet (Live from Holland)" – 4:11
"Not the Doctor (Live from Holland)" – 3:58

CD 5: Head Over Feet

"Head Over Feet (Album Version)" – 4:27
"You Learn (Live from Michigan)" – 4:15
"Right Through You (Live from Michigan)" – 3:12
"Hand in My Pocket (Live from Brisbane)" – 4:29
"Ironic (Live from Sydney) – 4:35

Credits
All lyrics written by Alanis Morissette
Music written by Alanis Morissette and Glen Ballard
Produced by Glen Ballard
Alanis Morissette:  Vocals, Harmonica

References

Alanis Morissette albums
Albums produced by Glen Ballard
1997 compilation albums